Sporobolus cryptandrus is a species of grass known as sand dropseed. It is native to North America, where it is widespread in southern Canada, most of the United States, and northern Mexico.

Description

Sporobolus cryptandrus is a perennial bunchgrass forming a tuft of stems growing up to a meter long, erect to decumbent in form. The stem bases are thick but not hard or woody. Some stand out from the stems in a perpendicular fashion. The inflorescence is dense and narrow when new, spreading out and becoming diffuse, with some branches sticking straight out, with age. The base of the inflorescence is often sheathed within the top leaf, which spreads out beside it. The grass produces abundant seeds; an individual inflorescence is capable of bearing 10,000 seeds.

Habitat
Sand dropseed is a common grass in many types of North American prairies and grows in a wide variety of other habitats, including disturbed areas such as roadsides.

Ecology
The seeds of this grass provide food for small birds and mammals, including scaled quail (Callipepla squamata) and black-tailed prairie dogs (Cynomys ludovicianus).

References

External links
Sporobolus cryptandrus - Photo gallery at CalPhotos

cryptandrus
Flora of North America